Saint Canna was a sixth-century mother of saints and later a nun in south Wales.

According to the writings of the unreliable Iolo Morganwg, Canna was a daughter of the Breton King Tudur Mawr, and widely held to be related to Saint Illtud.

She married her cousin Sadwrn, and in his old age, Sadwyn accompanied Saint Cadfan to Britain where he founded two churches, one in Anglesey and one in Carmarthenshire. Canna accompanied her husband, with their son Crallo. After the death of Sadwrn, she remarried and became the mother of Saint Elian Geimiad.

Canna founded a church in West Wales and then became a nun. She reportedly founded a church in Llangan in the Vale of Glamorgan, where there is a church dedicated to her, built on the site of at least one previous. There was a well below the old church called Ffynnon Ganna, {Canna's Holy Well}, whose water was believed to have curative properties and was a site of pilgrimage for many centuries.

Her name also appears as part of two Cardiff districts: Canton (English translation of the Welsh Treganna, Saint Canna's Town); and Pontcanna (Welsh for Canna's Bridge). St. Canna's Close is located in Canton.

Canna's Feast day is celebrated on 25 October.

A Masonic Lodge No. 6725, within South Wales Eastern Division, is named after Saint Canna.

St Crallo's Church is dedicated to Canna's son, the 6th century Celtic saint, Saint Crallo, whose feast is August 8. The village in which the church is situated, Coychurch is known in the Welsh language as Llangrallo; Llan – Church, Grallo – Crallo, the church of Crallo. It is believed that the saint founded a church on the site before the construction of the present medieval building.

References

6th-century births
6th-century deaths
Medieval Breton saints
Welsh nuns
6th-century Christian saints
Female saints of medieval France
Female saints of medieval Wales
6th-century Welsh people
6th-century Welsh women
6th-century Breton people
People whose existence is disputed